The 2022–23 network television schedule for the five major English commercial broadcast networks in Canada covers primetime hours from September 2022 through August 2023. The schedule is followed by a list per network of returning series, new series, and series canceled after the 2021–22 television season, for Canadian, American, and other series. CBC was first to announce its fall schedule on June 1, 2022, followed by Citytv on June 7, 2022, Global on June 8, 2022, and CTV and CTV 2 on June 9, 2022. CBC was first to announce its Winter schedule on November 30, 2022, Global on December 8, 2022, Citytv on December 14, 2022 and CTV on December 16, 2022. Yes TV (including ) and Omni Television are not included as member television stations have local flexibility over most of their schedules. CTV 2 is not included on Saturday as it normally only schedules encore programming in primetime on Saturdays.

Legend

  Grey indicates encore programming.
  Blue-grey indicates news programming.
  Light green indicates sporting events/coverage.

  Red indicates Canadian content shows, which is programming that originated in Canada.

  Light yellow indicates the current schedule.

Schedule
 New series to Canadian television are highlighted in bold.
 All times given are in Canadian Eastern Time and Pacific Time (except for some live events or specials, including most sports, which are given in Eastern Time). Subtract one hour for Central time for most programs (excluding CBC). Airtimes may vary in the Atlantic and Mountain times and do not necessarily align with U.S. stations in the Mountain time zone. Add one half-hour to Atlantic Time schedule for Newfoundland time. (See also: Effects of time zones on North American broadcasting)
 Dates (e.g., (9/13)) indicate the first month and day of a program in its regular timeslot, not necessarily the premiere date.

Sunday

Monday

Tuesday

Wednesday

Thursday

Friday

Saturday

By network

CBC

Returning series:
22 Minutes
Diggstown
Dragon's Den
Family Feud Canada
The Fifth Estate
The Great Canadian Baking Show
Heartland
Marketplace
Moonshine
Murdoch Mysteries
The National
The Nature of Things
The New Wave of Standup
The Passionate Eye
Pretty Hard Cases
Race Against the Tide
Run the Burbs
Son of a Critch
Sort Of
Still Standing
Strays
Travel Man: 48 Hours In...
War of the Worlds
Workin' Moms

New series:
Bones of Crows
Bollywed
Canada's Ultimate Challenge
Comedy Night with Rick Mercer
Essex County
Fakes
The Legacy Awards
Lido TV
The North Water
Plan B
Ridley Road
SkyMed
Stay Tooned
Stuff the British Stole
Summit '72

Not returning from 2021–22:
A Suitable Boy
Coroner
Hot Docs at Home
TallBoyz
Victoria

Citytv

Returning series
America's Got Talent
American Auto
American Idol
The Bachelor
Bachelor in Paradise
Bachelor in Paradise Canada
Canada's Got Talent
Capital One College Bowl
Chicago Fire
Chicago Med
Chicago P.D.
Dateline NBC (Friday broadcasts only moved from CHCH)
Grand Crew
Hell's Kitchen
Hockey Night in Canada
Hudson & Rex
Jimmy Kimmel Live! (late night)
Law & Order
Law & Order: Organized Crime
Law & Order: Special Victims Unit
That's My Jam
Young Rock

New series
The Jennifer Hudson Show (daytime)
Lopez vs. Lopez
Poker Face (Citytv+)
Quantum Leap
Wong & Winchester

Not returning from 2021–22:
Black-ish
Dancing with the Stars (moved to Disney+)
The Endgame
Kenan
Mr. Mayor
Ordinary Joe

CTV/CTV 2

Returning series
9-1-1: Lone Star
The Amazing Race
The Amazing Race Canada
Big Sky
Blue Bloods
Bob Hearts Abishola
Call Me Kat
Celebrity Wheel of Fortune
Children Ruin Everything
The Cleaning Lady
The Conners
Etalk
The Goldbergs
The Good Doctor
Grey's Anatomy
Kung Fu
La Brea
Lego Masters
Magnum P.I.
The Masked Singer
MasterChef
Next Level Chef
The Resident
The Rookie
Shark Tank
Station 19
Sunday Night Football
Thursday Night Football
Transplant
The Voice
W5
Weakest Link
The Wonder Years
Young Sheldon

New series
Alaska Daily
Alert: Missing Persons Unit
Almost Paradise
America's Got Talent: All-Stars
Battle of the Generations
Celebrity Jeopardy!
The Company You Keep
Cross Country Cake Off
East New York
Farming for Love
Night Court
The Rookie: Feds
Shelved
Sight Unseen
The Spencer Sisters
Sullivan's Crossing
True Lies
Will Trent

Not returning from 2021–22:
America's Got Talent: Extreme
B Positive
The Big Leap
Home Economics (moved to Global)
Our Kind of People
Pivoting
Queens
This Is Us

Global

Returning series
9-1-1
48 Hours
60 Minutes
Abbott Elementary
Big Brother Canada
The Blacklist
Crime Beat
CSI: Vegas
Departure 
The Equalizer
ET
ET Canada
Family Law
FBI
FBI: International
FBI: Most Wanted
Ghosts
Home Economics (moved from CTV)
NCIS
NCIS: Hawai'i
NCIS: Los Angeles 
The Neighborhood
New Amsterdam
Survivor
S.W.A.T.

New series
Accused
Fire Country
Monarch
The Real Love Boat
Robyn Hood
So Help Me Todd

Not returning from 2021–22:
Bull
Good Sam
How We Roll
SEAL Team (moved to Paramount+)
The Thing About Pam
United States of Al
Women of the Movement
Days of our Lives (daytime moved to W Network)

Renewals

CBC
 SkyMed—Renewed for a second season on March 3, 2023.
 Sort Of—Renewed for a third season on December 15, 2022.

Citytv
 Quantum Leap—Renewed for a second season on December 12, 2022.

CTV/CTV 2
 The Amazing Race—Renewed for a thirty-fifth season on February 21, 2023.
 Bob Hearts Abishola—Renewed for a fifth season on January 25, 2023.
 The Cleaning Lady—Renewed for a third season on February 1, 2023.
 Football Night in America—Renewed for an eighteenth season on March 18, 2021; deal will go to a twenty-eighth season in 2033.
 La Brea—Renewed for a third season on January 31, 2023.
 Lego Masters—Renewed for a fourth season on December 14, 2022.
 Lingo—Renewed for a second season on February 21, 2023.
 Magnum P.I.—Renewed for a sixth season on June 30, 2022.
 NBC Sunday Night Football—Renewed for an eighteenth season on March 18, 2021; deal will go to a twenty-eighth season in 2033.
 Night Court—Renewed for a second season on February 2, 2023.
 Young Sheldon—Renewed for a seventh season on March 30, 2021.

Global
 48 Hours—Renewed for a thirty-fifth season on February 21, 2023.
 60 Minutes—Renewed for a fifty-sixth season on February 21, 2023.
 Abbott Elementary—Renewed for a third season on January 11, 2023.
 CSI: Vegas—Renewed for a third season on February 21, 2023.
 The Equalizer—Renewed for a fourth season on May 5, 2022.
 FBI—Renewed for a sixth season on May 9, 2022.
 FBI: International—Renewed for a third season on May 9, 2022.
 FBI: Most Wanted—Renewed for a fifth season on May 9, 2022.
 Fire Country—Renewed for a second season on January 6, 2023.
 Ghosts—Renewed for a third season on January 12, 2023.
 The Neighborhood—Renewed for a sixth season on January 23, 2023.
 So Help Me Todd—Renewed for a second season on February 2, 2023.
 Survivor—Renewed for a forty-fifth season on February 21, 2023.
 Tough as Nails—Renewed for a fifth season on March 9, 2022.

Cancellations/series endings

CBC
 Diggstown—It was announced on October 6, 2022, that season four would be the final season. The series concluded on November 16, 2022.
 Pretty Hard Cases —It was announced on February 8, 2023, that season three would be the final season. The series concluded on March 8, 2023.
 Workin' Moms —It was announced on June 20, 2022, that season seven would be the final season. The series will conclude on March 28, 2023.

CTV/CTV2
 The Goldbergs—It was announced on February 23, 2023, that season ten would be the final season.

Global
 The Blacklist—It was announced on February 1, 2023, that season ten would be the final season.
 NCIS: Los Angeles—It was announced on January 20, 2023, that season fourteen would be the final season. The series will conclude on May 14, 2023.
 New Amsterdam—On March 14, 2022 it was announced that New Amsterdam would end after its upcoming 13-episode fifth season.
 Monarch — On December 7, 2022 it was announced that Monarch was canceled after a single season.
 The Real Love Boat—It was announced on October 28, 2022, that the series would move to Paramount+ beginning November 2, 2022 after its first four episodes due to poor ratings, marking the first cancellation of the season.

Ratings 
Canadian TV ratings provider Numeris quietly announced in August 2022 that, as of the start of the 2022–23 broadcast year on August 29, it would no longer produce reports of the top 30 programs each week, meaning any publicly-available ratings data going forward will be limited to the data the networks choose to publicize themselves. The agency has thus far declined to comment on its reasons for the change.

See also
 2022–23 United States network television schedule

Footnotes

References

 
 
Canadian television schedules